Major-General Beverley Woon Browne,  (10 September 1883 – 17 March 1948) was a Canadian Army general who served in both World War I and World War II.

Life and career 
Born in Haysville, Ontario, Browne was commissioned into the Canadian Militia in 1901. He served in France during the First World War with the Canadian Expeditionary Force, and received the Distinguished Service Order and the Military Cross, in addition of being mentioned in dispatches three times. He remained with the Permanent Force after the war, and at the outbreak of the Second World War was appointed Adjutant-General. In 1942 he was appointed Director-General of the Reserve Army, and retired the following year.

In retirement, he was appointed Assistant National Commissioner of the Canadian Red Cross in 1943, serving until his death in Ottawa in 1948. In 1944 he was appointed a Companion of the Order of the Bath.

References

External links
Generals of World War II

1883 births
1948 deaths
People from the Regional Municipality of Waterloo
Canadian Army officers
Canadian Companions of the Order of the Bath
Canadian Companions of the Distinguished Service Order
Canadian recipients of the Military Cross
Canadian Militia officers
Canadian military personnel of World War I
Canadian Expeditionary Force officers
Canadian military personnel of World War II
Canadian generals
Canadian Army generals of World War II
Canadian military personnel from Ontario